Platinum & Gold Collection is a 2003 compilation of Cowboy Junkies songs recorded for RCA Records. The album is the second compilation of the band's singles released by RCA in just three years, following 2001's Best of the Cowboy Junkies, and is part of the label's Platinum & Gold Collection series of discount-priced singles anthologies. All songs are drawn from the band's RCA Records albums: The Trinity Session, The Caution Horses, Black Eyed Man and Pale Sun, Crescent Moon.

Track listing

Fan reception 
RCA assembled this greatest hits album without participation with the band, using the albums in the RCA catalog. Junkies fan sites suggest boycotting the album, and support the purchasing Waltz Across America instead.

References

External links 

Cowboy Junkies albums
2003 compilation albums